In Luritja mythology, Julana is a lecherous spirit who surprises women by burrowing beneath the sand, leaping out, and raping them. He was alive, and wandered the Earth with his father, Njirana, during the Dreamtime.

Australian Aboriginal gods

Mythological rapists